The 1953 Fordham Rams football team represented Fordham University as an independent during the 1953 college football season. The Rams went 4–5 and amassed 176 points while their defense allowed 128 points.

Schedule

References

Fordham
Fordham Rams football seasons
Fordham Rams football